The Academy of the Holy Family (AHF) is an accredited private, Roman Catholic, all-girls college-preparatory school in Baltic, Connecticut, located in the Roman Catholic Diocese of Norwich.

Background

The Sisters of Charity of Our Lady Mother of Mercy was founded as a parochial community by Monsignor John Zwijsen on November 23, 1832 at Tilburg in the Netherlands. It was his intention to "simply to “establish a school where poor children could be taught reading, writing, sewing, and knitting”. The community soon spread beyond the parish, and in 1874 was invited to open a school in the United States.

When the Sisters arrived they first established a grade school and a girls’ high school for day and resident students in the small mill town of Sprague, Connecticut where the Motherhouse is located. In 1970, the Sisters of Charity of Our Lady, Mother of the Church, split off as a separate community and continue to run HFA.

Currently
The Academy is approved by the State of Connecticut and is accredited by the New England Association of Schools and colleges. The Academy of the Holy Family is owned and operated by the Sisters of Charity of Our Lady, Mother of the Church.

Notes and references

External links
 

Catholic secondary schools in Connecticut
Schools in New London County, Connecticut
Girls' schools in Connecticut
Sprague, Connecticut
Boarding schools in Connecticut
Catholic boarding schools in the United States